The Hundred-word Eulogy is a 100-character praise of Islam and the Islamic prophet Muhammad written by the Hongwu Emperor of the Chinese Ming dynasty. Copies of it are on display in several mosques in Nanjing, China.

Text
It was recorded that "His Majesty ordered to have mosques built in Xijing and Nanjing (the capital cities), and in southern Yunnan, Fujian and Guangdong. His Majesty also personally wrote baizizan (eulogy) in praise of the Prophet's virtues."

See also
 Shangdi
 Islam in China

References

External links
 Dedicated page with two English translations, images, and original audio recodings.
 image

Ming dynasty
Ming dynasty literature
Islamic literature
Islam in China